Latvian Internet Exchange (LIX) — is an internet exchange point located in Riga, Latvia.

References

External links 
 AS numbers and IPv4 addresses routed through LIX
 www.lix.lv — official web site of Latvian Internet Exchange

Internet in Latvia